East Rajasthan Uplands (Marwar Uplands) is a region of rolling plateau with rounded hills and forest. It is located in the western part of the Aravali Range of the Rajasthan state in northwest India, and forms part of the Central Highlands of India. These highlands range in altitude from 250 to 500 m above sea level and the terrain slopes down to the east. The uplands region has been shaped by erosion from the Banas River network. The soil in this region is fertile but sandy, and is prone to erosion.

References

Landforms of Rajasthan
Geography of Rajasthan